Vaada (translation: Promise) is a 2005 Indian Indian romantic mystery thriller film directed by Satish Kaushik. The film stars Arjun Rampal, Amisha Patel and Zayed Khan in lead roles. The story revolves around a murder amidst a convoluted love-triangle. It released on 7 January 2005. It's a remake of Sabhash starring Parthiban, Divya Unni and Ranjith.

Plot
Rahul Verma  and Karan Srivastav are business partners. The film begins with the discovery of the body of Pooja Sharma, Rahul's wife. Pooja has apparently committed suicide by hanging herself, however, before the postmortem can take place, her body goes missing.

A flashback reveals that Karan used to be Pooja's boyfriend. Karan was extremely possessive of Pooja, and the pair broke up after an incident where Karan stabbed a man with a fork and forced Pooja to leave her home and her father.
After the break up, Karan leaves town, and Pooja meets Rahul, who is a loving and successful businessman. The pair get married, however tragedy strikes when they are involved in a car crash and Rahul loses his eyesight.

Karan has now become a wealthy businessman, and becomes partners with Rahul, unaware of who his wife is. At a meeting held in Rahul's house, Karan is shocked to learn that Rahul is married to Pooja.

In the present, the police investigating the case begin to suspect that Pooja's death is not a suicide after all. They also believe that Karan may have been involved in the crime. Pooja's jewellery and other evidence is found at Karan's house. Karan believes that he is being framed, and enlists his friend Rajat Saxena to help him prove his innocence. Karan thinks that Rahul is the most likely suspect, and sets out to confront him. Karan ends up bribing Rahul's servant Alex to tell confess if Rahul is blind or not and he agrees to say this in court. The men end up in a fight, after Rahul uses his eyesight to save a young boy from an incoming train. It is revealed that Rahul has actually regained his sight and is not blind after all. Karan believes that Rahul had killed Pooja, and forces him to confess, recording the admission. However, Rahul had control of the remote for the recording device and only captured Karan's words, making it appear as if he was confessing to the murder. 
The police, led by Inspector Khan, arrive at the scene. In court, Rahul testifies against Karan and so does Alex after he exposes him of the bribe and will always remain loyal to Rahul. Karan is arrested for the murder and sentenced to life imprisonment and the Judge rules that Saxena can no longer be Karan's lawyer. In the holding cells, Karan manages to bribe a Constable, exchanging his watch for a tape recorder. That night, Rahul comes to meet Karan, and tells him that he knows that Karan did not kill his wife.

Rahul explains that he had found out that his blindness was curable, and secretly travelled abroad for the operation, telling his wife that he was on a business trip. He intended to surprise Pooja, but upon his arrival, he found her in Karan's arms. This infuriated him, but he kept quiet. However, later that day Pooja realised that he was no longer blind and short while after, she committed suicide.
After her death, Rahul and Alex found an audio cassette recorded by Pooja. In the cassette, Pooja explained that while Rahul was on his business trip, Karan came to the couple's house. Pooja threw him out after an argument, but he followed her back into the bedroom and threatened to burn the house down with her inside it, unless she renewed her relationship with him.  Pooja had no choice but to agree to divorce Rahul and then marry Karan. That night, Pooja tried to contact Rahul, but Karan caught her and told her that the stress of the situation would cause Rahul to become permanently blind. The next morning, Karan wrote up 
divorce papers for Pooja and Rahul, after which he embraced her. At that moment, Rahul returned from his trip and saw the pair.

Rahul tells Karan that Pooja did indeed commit suicide, but her death was a result of Karan's actions so he is her murderer. Rahul then explains how he vowed to get vengeance by framing Karan for the crime, so that he and his wife may finally have peace.
Karan reveals that he has finally caught Rahul, and jubilantly shows him the tape recorder. However, Rahul tells him that he had anticipated this move and says that the tape recorder has no batteries. Rahul further reveals that Saxena has been working with him the entire time and helped him with the plan. He finally walks away, leaving Karan distraught and alone in his cell. 
In the end, Rahul is seen immersing Pooja's ashes in the river.

Cast
Arjun Rampal as Rahul Verma
Ameesha Patel as Pooja Sharma / Pooja Rahul Verma
Zayed Khan as Karan Srivastav
Alok Nath as Mr. Sharma, Pooja's father (special appearance)
Rakesh Bedi as Advocate Saxena
Virendra Saxena as Alex
Rajesh Vivek as Inspector Khan
Shashi Kiran as Book Shop Owner
Achyut Potdar as Judge
Anil Saxena 
Anjan Srivastav as Lawyer
Sarfaraz Khan as Sufi Singer in Ud Ud Ud Jaye.

Soundtrack

References

External links
 

2005 films
2000s Hindi-language films
2000s romantic thriller films
Films shot in Singapore
Films scored by Himesh Reshammiya
Hindi remakes of Tamil films
Indian romantic thriller films
Films about blind people in India
Films directed by Satish Kaushik
Indian films about revenge